Observator is the sixth studio  album by The Raveonettes, and was released on 11 September 2012.

Background
Singer Sune Rose Wagner traveled to Venice Beach to gather inspiration for a new album. He ended up going on three-day drug and alcohol bender due to depression he was suffering because of back injury. Songs on the album are inspired by observations of the people he met during this time. The album was recorded in two to three weeks at Sunset Sound Recorders in Los Angeles because of Wagner's desire to record where The Doors "did all their best stuff" and "environment surrounded by all those ghosts of genius".

Reception

The album received generally positive reviews upon its release. At Metacritic, which assigns a normalised rating out of 100 to reviews from mainstream critics, the album received an average score of 73, based on 17 reviews, which indicates "Generally favorable reviews".

Track listing

Release history

References

2012 albums
The Raveonettes albums
Vice Records albums
Albums produced by Richard Gottehrer
Albums recorded at Sunset Sound Recorders